Miss World 2009, the 59th edition of the Miss World pageant, was held on 12 December 2009 at the Gallagher Convention Centre in Johannesburg, South Africa. 112 contestants from all over the world competed for the crown, marking the biggest turnout in the pageant's history. Ksenia Sukhinova of Russia crowned her successor Kaiane Aldorino of Gibraltar at the end of event. It is the first time that someone from Gibraltar won Miss World. In the past, people from mainland Britain have won.

Results

Placements

Continental Queens of Beauty

Order of Announcements

Top 16

 Top 7

Candidates

  – Armina Mevlani
  – Nadia Silva
  – Evelyn Lucía Manchón
  – Nuraisa Lispiër
  – Sophie Lavers
  – Anna Hammel
  – Joanna Brown
  – Leah Marville
  – Yulia Sindzeyeva
  – Zeynep Sever
  – Norma Leticia Lara
  – Flavia Foianini
  – Andrea Šarac
  – Sumaiyah Marope
  – Luciana Reis
  – Antonia Petrova
  – Lena Ma
  – Yu Sheng
  – Daniela Ramos
  – Angie Alfaro
  – Dacoury Rosine Gnago
  – Ivana Vasilj
  – Chantalle Thomassen
  – Christalla Tsiali
  – Aneta Vignerová
  – Nadia Pederson
  – Ana Contreras
  – Gabriela Ulloa
  – Samah Shalaby
  – Elena Tedesco
  – Katrina Hodge
  – Lula Weldegebriel
  – Sanna Kankaanpää
  – Chloé Mortaud
  – Tsira Suknidze
  – Stefanie Peeck
  – Mawuse Appea
  – Kaiane Aldorino
  – Alkisti Anyfanti
  – Béatrice Blaise
  – Alida Reyes
  – Imarah Radix
  – Blaise Masey
  – Sandy Lau
  – Orsolya Serdült
  – Guðrún Dögg Rúnarsdóttir
  – Pooja Chopra
  – Kerenina Sunny Halim
  – Laura Patterson
  – Adi Rudnitzky
  – Alice Taticchi
  – Kerrie Baylis
  – Eruza Sasaki
  – Dina Nuraliyeva
  – Fiona Konchellah
  – Kim Joo-ri
  – Ieva Lase
  – Martine Andraos
  – Shu-rina Wiah †
  – Vaida Petraškaitė
  – Diana Nilles
  – Suzana Al-Salkini
  – Thanuja Ananthan
  – Shanel Debattista
  – Ingrid Littré
  – Anaïs Veerapatren
  – Perla Beltrán Acosta
  – Maria Bragaru
  – Battsetseg Batbaatar
  – Marijana Pokrajac
  – Happie Ntelamo
  – Zenisha Moktan
  – Avalon-Chanel Weyzig
  – Magdalena Schoeman
  – Glory Chukwu
  – Cherie Gardiner
  – Sara Skjoldnes
  – Nadege Herrera
  – Tamara Sosa
  – Claudia Carrasco
  – Marie-Ann Umali
  – Anna Jamróz
  – Marta Cadilha
  – Jennifer Colón
  – Loredana Violeta Salanta
  – Ksenia Shipilova
  – Katharine Brown
  – Jelena Marković
  – Mariatu Kargbo
  – Pilar Carmelita Arlando
  – Barbora Franeková
  – Tina Petelin
  – Tatum Keshwar
  – Carmen García
  – Gamya Wijayadasa
  – Zoureena Rijger
  – Nompilo Mncina
  – Erica Harrison
  – Nanihi Bambridge
  – Miriam Gerald
  – Pongchanok Kanklab
  – Ashanna Arthur
  – Ebru Şam
  – Maria Namiiro
  – Evheniya Tulchevska
  – Lisa-Marie Kohrs
  – Claudia Vanrell
  – María Milagros Véliz
  – Trần Thị Hương Giang
  – Lucy Whitehouse
  – Sekwila Mumba
  – Vanessa Sibanda

Judges
 Julia Morley – Chairwoman of the Miss World Organization
 Priyanka Chopra – Miss World 2000 from India
 Zhang Zilin – Miss World 2007 from China PR
 Mike Dixon – Musical Director
 JJ Schoeman – Designer
 Lindiwe Mahlangu-Kwele – CEO Johannesburg Tourism Company
 Graham Cooke – MD World Travel Group
 Warren Batchelor – Executive Producer of Miss World 2009

Notes

Returns

Last competed in 1985:
 
Last competed in 1990:
 
Last competed in 2006:
 
 
Last competed in 2007:

Replacements
  – Due to the media attention following the allegations against her, Rachel Christie has now decided to withdraw from the Miss World competition and relinquish her Miss England crown. Katrina Hodge replaced her to participate in Miss World 2009.
  – Alessandra Alores was disqualified due to several nude pictures of her on the Internet. Stefanie Peeck replaced her to participate in Miss World 2009.
  – Sofia Rudieva was allowed to compete in Miss Universe 2009 by the Miss Universe Organization, but the Miss World Organization did not accept her as a contestant due several nude pictures of her on the Internet. Ksenia Shipilova replaced her to participate in Miss World 2009.
  – The original winner, Ris Low, backed out of the finals at Miss World 2009. Her decision came after a slew of negative media reports in which she incurred the ire of the public for her poor English. Later, news of her conviction for credit card fraud in May also surfaced, after she stole credit cards worth $6000. She was sentenced to two years' probation for credit card fraud. There was a national petition for her to step down. Then, Ris Low was diagnosed with bipolar disorder. The first runner-up Claire Lee, declined to represent Singapore due to a back injury which prevents her from standing for long periods of time, and also as Ris Low accused her of backstabbing her, and she withdrew from the pageant immediately. Claire Lee also rebutted Ris Low's allegations on her blog. On 9 October, ERM World Marketing announced Pilar Carmelita Arlando as the new Miss Singapore World 2009, who represented Singapore at the Miss World contest.  She was criticised by many netizens for not knowing who's the first president of Singapore, not knowing how many years Singapore has been independent, and claiming that the Merlion, a symbol of Singapore, became extinct in 1965, unaware that the Merlion is a fictitious animal.
  – Cinthia D'Ottone was the original Uruguayan representative to Miss World 2009, but she was replaced at the last minute by Claudia Vanrell due to Cinthia's health related issues.
  – Trần Thị Hương Giang was appointed to represent Vietnam at Miss World 2009. She is the 2nd runner-up of Miss Vietnam Global 2009.

Withdrawals
  – Due to lack of funding and sponsorship
  – Due to lack of funding and sponsorship for the national pageant
  – Due to lack of funding and sponsorship for the national pageant
  – Due to lack of funding and sponsorship
  – Due to lack of funding and sponsorship
  – Venetta Zakers, the winner of the Miss World Saint Kitts and Nevis 2009 pageant, did not compete in Miss World 2009 due to communication problems between her and the national pageant organisation. However, the pageant was held again in 2010 to select the representative for Miss World 2010.
  – Due to lack of funding and sponsorship
  – Due to lack of funding and sponsorship

Did not compete
  - Tamara Lawrence

References

External links

 Pageantopolis – Miss World 2009

Miss World
2009 in South Africa
2009 beauty pageants
Beauty pageants in South Africa
December 2009 events in South Africa
2000s in Johannesburg